Smyrna is an unincorporated community in Franklin Township, Clarke County, Iowa, United States.

History
Smyrna's population was 44 in 1902.

References

Unincorporated communities in Clarke County, Iowa
Unincorporated communities in Iowa